Stomphastis is a genus of moths in the family Gracillariidae.

Species
Stomphastis adesa Triberti, 1988
Stomphastis aphrocyma (Meyrick, 1918)
Stomphastis cardamitis (Meyrick, 1921)
Stomphastis chalybacma (Meyrick, 1908)
Stomphastis conflua (Meyrick, 1914)
Stomphastis crotoniphila Vári, 1961
Stomphastis crotonis Vári, 1961
Stomphastis dodonaeae Vári, 1961
Stomphastis eugrapta Vári, 1961
Stomphastis heringi Vári, 1963
Stomphastis horrens (Meyrick, 1932)
Stomphastis labyrinthica (Meyrick, 1918)
Stomphastis mixograpta Vári, 1961
Stomphastis polygoni Vári, 1961
Stomphastis rorkei Vári, 1961
Stomphastis thraustica (Meyrick, 1908)
Stomphastis tremina Vári, 1961

External links
Global Taxonomic Database of Gracillariidae (Lepidoptera)

 
Gracillariinae
Gracillarioidea genera